ASAH or Asah may refer to:

 Aneurysmal subarachnoid haemorrhage, a neurological emergency: bleeding from ruptured aneurysm
 Asah Spencer, a Native American painter
 N-acylsphingosine amidohydrolase (acid ceramidase), an enzymatic product of ASAH1, gene mutated in Farber disease
 Australian Society for Asian Humanities